Reuben Gillmer (1868 – 4 January 1920) was a British screenwriter of the silent film era.

Selected filmography
 On the Banks of Allan Water (1916)
 Nursie! Nursie! (1916)
 The Lost Chord (1917)
 Home Sweet Home (1917)
 Love's Old Sweet Song (1917)
 Ave Maria (1918)
 A Romany Lass (1918)
 Nature's Gentleman (1918)
 The Great Impostor (1918)
 The Man Who Forgot (1919)

References

Bibliography
 Jill Nelmes. Analysing the Screenplay. Routledge, 2010.

External links

1868 births
1920 deaths
20th-century British screenwriters